Jane Shore is an American poet.

Life
She graduated from Goddard College, and moved from Vermont to the Iowa Writers' Workshop.  She graduated from Radcliffe College in 1972, where she was a student of Elizabeth Bishop.

Shore met Howard Norman in 1981, and they married in 1984  They have a daughter, Emma (born 1988).

Norman and Shore lived in Cambridge, New Jersey, Oahu, and Vermont, before settling into homes in Chevy Chase, Maryland near Washington, D.C. during the school year, and East Calais, Vermont in the summertime. Their friend, the author David Mamet and Shore's Goddard College classmate, lives nearby.

During the summer of 2003, poet Reetika Vazirani was housesitting the Normans' Chevy Chase home.  There, on July 16, she killed her young son before committing suicide.

Career
She has edited Ploughshares, and her poems have been published in numerous magazines, including Poetry, The New Republic, and The Yale Review

She was Radcliffe Institute, fellow in poetry, 1971–73, and Briggs-Copeland Lecturer in English at Harvard University, 1973—, and Jenny McKean Moore Writer at George Washington University in Washington, D.C.  She was visiting distinguished poet at the University of Hawaii.

She is currently a professor at The George Washington University.

Awards
 Eye Level, winner of the 1977 Juniper Prize
 The Minute Hand, awarded the 1986 Lamont Poetry Prize
 Music Minus One, a finalist for the 1996 National Book Critic Circle Award
 1991 Guggenheim Fellowship
 two grants from the N.E.A.
 fellow in poetry at the Mary Ingraham Bunting Institute
 Alfred Hodder Fellow at Princeton University
 Goodyear Fellow at the Foxcroft School in Virginia

Bibliography

Poetry collections

Anthologies

Poems

References

External links
 "Jane Shore and Dabney Stuart Poetry Reading", 10/23/2008, Library of Congress
 "Jane Shore on NPR", May 12, 2009, GW English News

American women poets
George Washington University faculty
Goddard College alumni
Harvard University faculty
Living people
People from Chevy Chase, Maryland
Radcliffe College alumni
The New Yorker people
University of Hawaiʻi faculty
University of Iowa alumni
Year of birth missing (living people)